North Newnton is a civil parish in Wiltshire, England,  southwest of Pewsey.  The parish is in the Vale of Pewsey which carries the upper section of the Salisbury Avon.

The parish includes the small village of Bottlesford and the hamlet of Hilcott.

History
Domesday Book recorded 33 households, and land held by Wilton Abbey, at Newetone in 1086.

The parish was described as follows in The National Gazetteer (1868):

Rainscombe was transferred to Wilcot parish in 1885, and Bottlesford was transferred from Manningford parish sometime after 1971.

Amenities
The Anglican Church of St James dates from the 13th century and is Grade II* listed. The church at West Knoyle, some twenty miles distant and also within a manor of Wilton Abbey, was a chapelry of North Newnton until the two parishes were separated in 1841.

The medieval settlement of North Newnton, by the church, has a small number of houses and a farm. Housing was built to the southeast in the 20th century, around the crossroads on the A345 to Pewsey. A pub, the Woodbridge Inn (built in the early 19th century) stands at the crossroads.

Hilcott has a village hall.

Governance
All significant local government services are provided by the Wiltshire Council unitary authority, with its headquarters in Trowbridge, and the parish is represented there by Paul Oatway, who succeeded Brigadier Robert Hall in 2013. In the House of Commons the parish is part of the Devizes constituency.

References

Further reading

External links

 North Newnton Parish Council
 

Villages in Wiltshire
Civil parishes in Wiltshire